An independence referendum was held in the Latvian SSR on 3 March 1991, alongside a similar referendum in the Estonian SSR the same day. Known as the "Popular Survey about the independence of the Republic of Latvia", voters were asked "are you in favour of a democratic and independent Republic of Latvia". It was approved by 74.9% of voters, with a turnout of 87.6%. Latvian Republic civilians registered in Soviet Army units also had the right to vote in this poll.

The independence of Latvia was finally restored on 21 August 1991.

Results

See also
1991 Estonian independence referendum
1991 Lithuanian independence referendum
1991 Soviet Union referendum

References

Singing Revolution
Latvia
Independence
Latvia
Referendums in Latvia
Referendums in the Soviet Union
Latvia
Dissolution of the Soviet Union